Belavatagi is a village in Dharwad district of Karnataka, India.

Demographics 
As of the 2011 Census of India there were 562 households in Belavatagi and a total population of 2,892 consisting of 1,478 males and 1,414 females. There were 346 children ages 0-6.

References

Villages in Dharwad district